Preso may refer to:

Presos, a 2015 Costa Rican film
"El Preso", a song by Fruko y sus Tesos, 1975
"Preso", a song by Rosalía from her 2018 album El mal querer